The Franco-Indigenous Alliance was an alliance between North American indigenous nations and the French, centered on the Great Lakes and the Illinois country during the French and Indian War (1754–1763). The alliance involved French settlers on the one side, and indigenous peoples such as the Abenaki, Odawa, Menominee, Winnebago, Mississauga, Illinois, Sioux, Huron, Petun, and Potawatomi on the other. It allowed the French and the natives to form a haven in the middle-Ohio valley before the open conflict between the European powers erupted.

Background

France had a long presence in Northern America, starting with the establishment of New France in 1534. Acculturation and conversion were promoted, especially through the activities of the Jesuit missions in North America. But unlike the other colonial powers, France, under the guidance of Louis XIII and Cardinal Richelieu, encouraged a peaceful coexistence in New France between Natives and Colonists. Indigenous persons, converted to Catholicism, were considered as "natural Frenchmen" by the Ordonnance of 1627:

According to the 19th-century historian Francis Parkman:

In many instance, French officials adopted Indian habits in order to gain their support. The French government officials and tribal sovereignty had an exchange program between Native children and French children that helped build diplomacy among the two groups, known as "metis". The Baron de Saint-Castin was adopted by an Abenaki tribe and married a native girl. Governor Frontenac danced and sang war songs at an Indian council, while Daniel Liénard de Beaujeu fought bare-chested and covered with war paints at the battle against Braddock. Natives also adopted French habits, like chief Kondiaronk who wanted to be buried in his uniform of captain or Kateri Tekakwitha who became a Catholic Saint.

French settlers and natives were allied in every conflict preceding the Seven Years' War: Father Rale's War, King George's War, Father Le Loutre's War. Intermarriages were also frequent in New France, giving rise to the Métis people.

Seven Years' War

In North America in the 18th century, the British outnumbered the French 20 to 1, a situation that urged France to ally with the majority of the First Nations. According to one French observer:

At the beginning of the conflict, despite the disproportion of the forces involved, the French and their allies managed to inflict defeats to the British, such as the Battle of Fort Necessity or the Battle of the Monongahela. Following the capture of Fort William Henry, the Marquis de Montcalm agreed to let the British withdraw with full honours of war - a civility that was not understood by some natives who massacred the British and their camp followers on their way to Fort Edward.

Facing major defeats in the hands of Britain's allies on the European theater of the war and with its navy unable to match the Royal Navy, France was unable to properly supply and support the Canadiens and their indigenous allies. Britain had a string of successes, especially with the Battle of Fort Niagara, and the Franco-Indian alliance started to unravel. At the same time, the British were making promises of support and protection to the natives. Finally, Quebec fell in September following the Battle of the Plains of Abraham.

At the conclusion of the Seven Years' War in 1763, New France was divided with Canada going to the British and Louisiana to the Spaniards.

Later history

Long after the extinction of New France in 1763, Franco-Indian communities would persist, practicing the Catholic faith, speaking French and using French names. From the Saint Lawrence to the Mississippi, cosmopolitan French communities accommodated Indians and Blacks.

During the American War of Independence and the onset of the Franco-American alliance, the French would again combine with Indian troops, as in the Battle of Kiekonga in 1780 under Augustin de La Balme.

In 1869 and 1885, Louis Riel led two Métis revolts against the Canadian government, known as the Red River Rebellion and the North-West Rebellion. The revolts were suppressed and Riel executed.

See also
 Foreign alliances of France
 French and Indian War
 Kahnawake surnames
 French colonization of the Americas

Notes

References
 Alfred A. Cave The French and Indian War 2004 Greenwood Press 
 Van Zandt, Cynthia. Brothers Among Nations: The Pursuit of Intercultural Alliances in Early America, 1580-1660. New York: Oxford University Press, 2008.

French and Indian War
Military alliances involving France
First Nations history
Native American history